Ooldea is a tiny settlement in South Australia.

Being near a permanent waterhole, Ooldea Soak, the area was frequented by Aboriginal peoples, and was the site of a camp for railway construction workers in the early 20th century, and the Ooldea Mission from 1933 to 1952.

History
Ooldea was an important camp during construction of the Trans-Australian Railway, as it is near a permanent clay pan waterhole surrounded by sand dunes, first discovered by Europeans when Ernest Giles used it in 1875. On 17 October 1917, the final link of the railway was completed at Ooldea, linking the western section from Kalgoorlie to the eastern section to Port Augusta. It was around this time that a severe drought led many desert people to migrate closer to the waterhole, increasing pressure on the limited water resources now largely reserved for use by trains. A centenary celebration was held at the siding in 2017.

It was the site of a mission established by the United Aborigines Mission (UAM) in 1933, which later included a children's dormitory housing around 60 children. In 1938 an Aboriginal reserve was created covering the land around the mission. The mission was visited twice by Norman Tindale and was home for many years to Daisy Bates, both concerned with understanding and protecting Aboriginal culture. A cairn commemorating Bates was designed by F. Millward Grey and erected in 1953.

In the 1950s, areas around Maralinga and Emu were used for nuclear testing by the British Government. Around this time the Australian Government resumed much Anangu land to be used for the Woomera Rocket testing Range. Aboriginal people in the area, who were Pila Nguru (Spinifex people, of the Great Victoria Desert) were moved to the Ooldea Mission, which closed in 1952 due to internal divisions in the church. The people did not want to move from there, as they were used to ranging the desert, and had used the Ooldea Soak as a water source for many generations.

The people were forcibly moved to a reserve established by the South Australian Government on a former sheep station at Yalata, where Yalata Mission was established by the Evangelical Lutheran Church of Australia. This was an environment quite alien to them, being desert people.

The town was dependent on the Tea and Sugar Train for the delivery of supplies until 1996 when the train was withdrawn.

The historic Ooldea Soak and Former United Aborigines Mission Site and Daisy Bates' Campsite are both listed on the South Australian Heritage Register.

References

Further reading 
 SA Museum – Norman Tindale

External links 

Towns in South Australia
Nullarbor Plain
Trans-Australian Railway